Dominic Wynn Woods (born June 20, 1992), better known by his stage name Sage the Gemini, is an American rapper and record producer from Fairfield, California. He is perhaps best known for his 2013 singles "Gas Pedal" (featuring Iamsu!), which peaked at number 29 on the Billboard Hot 100, and "Red Nose", as well his feature on Flo Rida's 2014 single "Going Down For Real (GDFR)". His debut studio album Remember Me was released through Republic Records in March 2014. He is a member of Bay Area hip hop collective The HBK Gang, and the only member of the group alongside singer Kehlani to be signed to a major label.

Life and career

1992–2012: Early life and career beginnings 
Sage the Gemini was born on June 20, 1992, in San Francisco, California. His family moved to Fairfield, California, when he was 6–7 years old. He started recording at the age of eleven with his brother after he bought a microphone from Gordon's Music and Sound shop in Fairfield, California. The first track he recorded, at 14, was titled "Made In China". Woods took the name Sage the Gemini due to the color of his eyes and his zodiac sign.

In 2008, Sage released his first single, "You Should Know" on MySpace. It became a viral hit, generating over three million views worldwide. He then joined Black Money Music Group. Being close friends with rapper Iamsu!, he also joined The HBK Gang, or the Heartbreak Gang.

2013–present: Remember Me 
In March 2013, Sage released the singles "Red Nose" and "Gas Pedal" featuring Iamsu!, the latter has reached number 29 on the US Billboard Hot 100, making it his first top 40 hit; it also reached number six on the Hot R&B/Hip-Hop Songs. The songs immediately became hits and gained substantial airplay, which persuaded Republic Records to sign a deal with him in August 2013. The Recording Industry Association of America certified "Red Nose" Gold and "Gas Pedal" Platinum. On March 25, 2014, Sage released his debut studio album, Remember Me.

In October 2014, he was featured on Flo Rida's single "G.D.F.R.", which peaked at number eight on the Billboard Hot 100. In July 2017, Sage released his debut mixtape, Morse Code, which includes the Gold certified single "Now and Later". "Now and Later" peaked at the #1 spot on the urban charts in Australia and the UK.

Personal life 
Sage has a daughter named Lai'lah Woods. Sage dated Jordin Sparks for a short time in 2015.

Discography 

 Remember Me (2014)

References

External links 
 

Living people
1992 births
The HBK Gang members
West Coast hip hop musicians
African-American rappers
African-American record producers
Record producers from California
People from Fairfield, California
21st-century American rappers
Rappers from the San Francisco Bay Area
Rappers from San Francisco